Helston Community College (formerly Gwealhellis Secondary Modern School) is a co-educational secondary school and sixth form located in Helston in the English county of Cornwall.

The South Site of the school was previously a grammar school that had Derwent Coleridge as a headmaster, his pupils including Charles Kingsley,  John Duke Coleridge, Richard Edmonds, Thomas Rowe Edmonds, John Rogers, Henry Trengrouse and James Trevenen.

Previously a foundation school administered by Cornwall Council and a Co-operative Trust, in June 2017 Helston Community College converted to academy status and is now sponsored by the Southerly Point Co-operative Multi Academy Trust.

Helston Community College offers GCSEs, BTECs and City and Guilds courses as programmes of study for pupils, while students in the sixth form have the option to study from a range of A Levels and further BTECs.

Pupils from the school take part in the annual Furry Dance, an ancient Cornish custom which is held on the Feast of St. Michael.

Notable former pupils 
Sharon Robinson, Antarctic researcher known for her work on climate change and bryophytes

References

External links
 

Secondary schools in Cornwall
Academies in Cornwall
Helston